Tom or Tommy Lloyd may refer to:

Tom Lloyd (artist) (1929–1996), American artist
Tom Lloyd (author) (born 1979), British novelist
Tom Lloyd (bushranger), Australian bushranger
Tom Lloyd, bass musician of The Del Fuegos
Tommy Lloyd (born 1974), American basketball coach
Tommy Lloyd (footballer) (1903–1984), English footballer

See also
Thomas Lloyd (disambiguation)